Platythecium is a genus of lichenized fungi in the family Graphidaceae. It contains an estimated 27 species.

Species
Platythecium acutisporum 
Platythecium albolabiatum 
Platythecium allosporellum 
Platythecium annonacea 
Platythecium biseptatum 
Platythecium commiscens 
Platythecium cristobalense 
Platythecium dimorphodes 
Platythecium floridanum 
Platythecium grammitis 
Platythecium hypoleptum 
Platythecium inspersum 
Platythecium intortula 
Platythecium leiogramma 
Platythecium maximum 
Platythecium nothofagi 
Platythecium pertenellum 
Platythecium pyrrhochroum 
Platythecium serpentinellum 
Platythecium seychellense 
Platythecium sphaerosporellum 
Platythecium sripadakandense  – Sri Lanka
Platythecium streimannii 
Platythecium suberythrellum 
Platythecium verrucoareolatum

References

Graphidaceae
Lichen genera
Ostropales genera